Dalelwala, sometimes spelled  Dalelwala, is a town in the Budhlada tehsil of Mansa district in East Punjab, India. It is also a block of the district. Punjabi is the mother tongue as well as the official language here.

Education and others 

There are many schools and for higher education, students goes to the nearby cities. 
School
Government High School, Dalelwala
Baba Farid Public School
Colleges near by
Guru Teg Bahadur College of Education, Dalelwala, Punjab
Nangal Road
Dalelwala (District Mansa)
Punjab, India                                                                                               #Govt. College, Mansa
National Post Graduate College, Bhikhi
S. D. Kanya Mahavidyala

Dalelwala info
Dalel Wala is a village in Jhunir Mandal in Mansa District in Punjab State in India.

Bajewala, Bana Wala, Beerae Wala Jattan, Behniwal, Bhalike, Bhamme Kalan, Bhamme Khurd, Buraj Bhalike, Chachuhar, Chaine Wala, Chappian Wali, ... . are the villages along with this village in the same Jhunir Mandal

Nearby villages are Danewala (3.3 km), Nandgarh (3.9 km), Lakhmirwala (3.9 km), Malko (4.3 km), Alampur Mandran (4.7 km), Tahlian (5.9 km), Deluana (6.5 km)

References

Cities and towns in Mansa district, India